Shiomi (written: 塩見 or 汐見) is a Japanese surname. Notable people with the surname include:

, Japanese actress
, Japanese photographer
, Japanese classical composer
Rick Shiomi (born 1947), Canadian playwright and theatre director
, Japanese actor
, Japanese baseball player
Gen Shiomi/Shiomi Iwao, the main protagonist of manga series Outrage Girl Shiomi

Japanese-language surnames